Ajcharaporn Kongyot (born June 18, 1995) is a Thai indoor volleyball player. She is a current member of the Thailand women's national volleyball team.

Career
She is on the list 2019 Korea-Thailand all star super match competition.

Clubs
  Bank DKI (2013)
  Supreme Chonburi-E.tech (2009–2021)
  Jakarta BNI 46 (2018–2019)
  Sarıyer Belediyesi (2021–present)

Awards

Individuals 
 2012–13 Thailand League – "Best Server"
 2013–14 Thailand League – "Best Outside Spiker"
 2014 VTV International Cup – "Best Best Spiker"
 2014–15 Thailand League – "Best Outside Spiker"
 2015 VTV Cup Championship – "Best Outside Spiker"
 2016 Montreux Volley Masters – "Best Outside Spiker"
 2016 Asian Cup – "Best Outside Spiker"
 2016–17 Thailand League – "Best Outside Spiker"
 2016–17 Thailand League – "Most Valuable Player"
 2018 Thai–Denmark Super League – "Most Valuable Player"
 2018 Asian Club Championship – "Best Outside Spiker"
 2018 Asian Club Championship – "Most Valuable Player"
 2018 Asian Cup – "Best Outside Spiker"
 2019 Asian Club Championship – "Best Opposite Spiker"
 ''2019-20 Thailand League - "Most Valuable Player"

Clubs
 2017 Thai–Denmark Super League –  Champion, with Supreme Chonburi
 2018 Thai-Denmark Super League –  Champion, with Supreme Chonburi
 2019 Thai–Denmark Super League –  Champion, with Supreme Chonburi
 2016–17 Thailand League –  Champion, with Supreme Chonburi
 2017–18 Thailand League –  Champion, with Supreme Chonburi
 2017 Asian Club Championship –  Champion, with Supreme Chonburi
 2018 Asian Club Championship –  Champion, with Supreme Chonburi
 2019 Asian Club Championship –  Runner-up, with Supreme Chonburi
 2019-20 Thailand League –  Champion, with Supreme Chonburi

Royal decorations
 2015 -  Gold Medalist (Sixth Class) of The Most Admirable Order of the Direkgunabhorn
 2013 -  Commander (Third Class) of The Most Exalted Order of the White Elephant

References

External links 

1995 births
Living people
Ajcharaporn Kongyot
Ajcharaporn Kongyot
Thai expatriate sportspeople in Indonesia
Thai expatriate sportspeople in Turkey
Expatriate volleyball players in Indonesia
Expatriate volleyball players in Turkey
Ajcharaporn Kongyot
Ajcharaporn Kongyot
Southeast Asian Games medalists in volleyball
Competitors at the 2013 Southeast Asian Games
Competitors at the 2015 Southeast Asian Games
Competitors at the 2017 Southeast Asian Games
Asian Games medalists in volleyball
Volleyball players at the 2018 Asian Games
Ajcharaporn Kongyot
Medalists at the 2018 Asian Games
Competitors at the 2019 Southeast Asian Games
Outside hitters
Opposite hitters
Ajcharaporn Kongyot
Competitors at the 2021 Southeast Asian Games